Jesse Love Jr. (born January 14, 2005) is an American stock car racing driver. He competes full-time in the ARCA Menards Series in Venturini Motorsports in the No. 20 Toyota Camry, and the No. 1 Toyota Tundra for TRICON Garage.

Love currently holds two records: He is the youngest winner ever in the ARCA Menards Series West, and the youngest winner ever in any NASCAR sanctioned event, both at 15 years, 5 months, and 13 days. He is also the youngest driver to win a NASCAR sanctioned championship; at age 15.. He was also the ARCA Menards Series West champion for 2020 and 2021.

Racing career

Love began racing at age five. Early in his career, he drove in the Quarter Midgets of America Series, where he won multiple races and championships before turning ten years old. He then went on to win championships in three different divisions of USAC in the same year, becoming the first driver to accomplish that. At age 13, Love, competing for Naake-Klauer Motorsports, was granted an age waiver to compete in the RPM Pro Late Model Series by Madera Speedway track promoter Kenny Shepherd due to his talent in the 51Fifty Energy Drink Jr. Late Model Series the prior year (in which he won another championship). In 2018, Love drove full-time in the INEX Legend Car Racing Series, winning five of the eight races on the schedule en route to that series' championship. The other series he raced in that year were the BCRA Midget Series and the Hunt Magneto Sprint Car Series, both of whom Love had to apply for an age exception to participate in. Love drove for Keith Kunz Motorsports in the SRL Southwest Tour, a late model racing series, in 2019.

On January 14, 2020, it was announced that Love would run full-time and for rookie of the year in the ARCA Menards Series West in the No. 19 Toyota for Bill McAnally Racing. He replaced Hailie Deegan in that car, who left the McAnally team and Toyota's driver development program to join Ford's driver development program, running full-time in the 20-race ARCA Menards Series for DGR-Crosley.

After finishing second in the season-opener at Las Vegas Bullring, Love won his first West Series race in the first of the two races in the doubleheader at the Utah Motorsports Campus road course on June 27. It was just his second start in the series. 

In addition, Love and his BMR teammates would compete in the ten races of the 20-race ARCA Menards Series' Sioux Chief Showdown. He made his debut in the first Showdown race at Phoenix Raceway on March 6. A few weeks earlier, Love and his teammates also made their debut in the ARCA Menards Series East at New Smyrna; Love finished twelfth.

Love finished the 2020 ARCA West season with 3 wins and 9 top 5 finishes in 11 races en route to the championship, beating out season-long rival Blaine Perkins. He became the youngest West Series champion at just 15 years, 9 months, and 24 days old.

In 2021, Love returned to BMR for his second season in the West Series, and moved from the No. 19 to the No. 16, replacing Gio Scelzi with the team condensing from four full-time cars to two and the No. 19 car being closed down. He also returned to Venturini Motorsports for a nine-race schedule in the main ARCA Menards Series (including all three combination races with the ARCA Menards Series East) as well as one non-combination race in the East Series (at Dover). In both series, he drove the No. 25.

Motorsports career results

NASCAR
(key) (Bold – Pole position awarded by qualifying time. Italics – Pole position earned by points standings or practice time. * – Most laps led.)

Craftsman Truck Series

ARCA Menards Series
(key) (Bold – Pole position awarded by qualifying time. Italics – Pole position earned by points standings or practice time. * – Most laps led.)

ARCA Menards Series East

ARCA Menards Series West

References

External links
 
 

Living people
2005 births
Racing drivers from California
People from Menlo Park, California
ARCA Menards Series drivers
ARCA Midwest Tour drivers